James Mulcahy (11 January 1858 – 17 July 1915) was a Canadian-American architect active primarily in Boston, Massachusetts, and the surrounding area from at least 1888 until his death in 1915. He served as Boston Building Commissioner from 1903 to 1906. He collaborated for many years with his nephew and fellow architect James E. McLaughlin, who designed Fenway Park, home stadium of the Boston Red Sox baseball team.

Early life
Mulcahy was born on 11 January 1858 in Halifax, Nova Scotia, Canada. His father Bartholomew Mulcahy (1811–1882) and mother Bridget O'Keefe (1822–1892) were both born in Ireland. In 1895 he married Katherine Alma McCormick (1872–1930). They had a son and a daughter together, both of whom died young: Ralph James Mulcahy (1895–1903) and Helen Alma Mulcahy (1897–1900).

Professional career
Mulcahy was a prolific and prominent architect, well-known and apparently well-liked by his Boston peers. He maintained an office at 43 Milk Street in Boston. He was in practice at least as early as 1888. In 1903 he was appointed Boston Building Commissioner by then Mayor of Boston Patrick Andrew Collins. Upon his appointment, the Boston-based trade magazine The American Architect and Building News congratulated Mulcahy, noting that "Mr. James Mulcahy, an architect of some fifteen years' practice...is still a comparatively young man, being only forty-three years old, but he has carried out a large number of important buildings." He served as Commissioner until he was dismissed in 1906, possibly as a result of losing political favor after Collins's death the year before.

Some of his later projects include Massachusetts Army National Guard armories in the central Massachusetts towns of Hingham, Hudson, Natick, and Newton. Mulcahy collaborated on the armory projects with his nephew (son of his sister) and fellow architect James E. McLaughlin; it is not clear whether they were formal business partners, though McLaughlin had worked with his uncle at Milk Street as early as 1893.

Later life
Towards the end of his life, Mulcahy was a resident of the Hotel Harvard on Huntington Avenue in Boston. Mulcahy died of complications related to heart disease on 17 July 1915 at the New England Sanitarium in Medford, Massachusetts. His death certificate lists his burial place as "Calvary Cemetery, Jamaica Plain", though no such cemetery existed then or exists now. It is possible Mulcahy was buried at Forest Hills Cemetery in Jamaica Plain or Mount Calvary Cemetery (also known as Calvary Cemetery or New Calvary Cemetery) in Roslindale, though neither cemetery's records corroborate this.

Works
This is a partial list.

Individual
 Copley School, Charlestown
 Evergreen Cemetery office, Boston
 Mount Hope Cemetery office, Boston
 Townhouse on Bay State Road, Boston
 William Bacon School, Roxbury
 William E. Russell School, Dorchester
 W. L. P. Boardman School, Roxbury

With James E. McLauglin
 Hingham Armory, Hingham
 Hudson Armory, Hudson
 Natick Armory, Natick
 Newton Armory, Newton

References

1858 births
1915 deaths
Architects from Boston
19th-century American architects
19th-century Canadian architects
20th-century American architects
20th-century Canadian architects